Gyurme Thekchok Tenzin (b.?) was the 2nd Dzogchen Rinpoche of Tibet.

Nomenclature and etymology
Full nomenclature:  Gyurme Thekchok Tenzin Thutop Wangpo Chok Thamchele Nampar Gyalwe De.

Exegesis
The Second Dzogchen Rinpoche was born in Mongolia.

Teachers
The Second Dzogchen Rinpoche was a student of Ponlop (Tibetan; "governor"), Rabjampa and other disciples of the 1st Dzogchen Rinpoche, Pema Rikzin; namely: Gyalwang Kalzang Gyatso,  Lochen Dharma Shri,  Gyalse Peme Gyurme Gyatsho,  Terchen Nyima Trakpa and son, Ngor Khenchen Palden Chokyong, amongst others.

The 2nd Dzogchen Rinpoche was involved with:  "...the establishment of the great treasury, the printing house at Lhundrup Teng in Derge, by his patron, the King of Derge."

Sadhana
The 2nd Dzogchen Rinpoche is key in the lineage of a number of sadhana (Sanskrit):  Phurba Yangsang ("innermost secret practice of Vajrakilaya"), Lama Demchok Khorlo (Tibetan; Sanskrit: Chakrasamvara), Shinje (Tibetan; Sanskrit: Yamantaka), Trochu (Tibetan: Heruka; "ten wrathful deities"), amongst others.

Students
The 2nd Dzogchen Rinpoche's principal students were: "...the Second Rabjam Gyurme Kunzang Namgyal, Ponlop Sangngak Tendzin, Nyitrul Pema Thekchok, Jetsunma Migyur Paldron."

See also
Kye-rim
Dzog-rim
Nyingma

Notes

References
Tulku Kalzang. "The Second through Fifth Dzogchen Rinpoches." From: Essential Summary of the Biographies of the Successive Reincarnations of Dzogchen Pema Rikzin (draft translation by the students of The Dzogchen Ponlop Rinpoche 1998. Web version omits footnotes.) 

Dzogchen Rinpoches
Nyingma lamas